Hurricane Run is a 1st order tributary to Rocky Run in New Castle County, Delaware.

Course
Hurricane Run rises about 0.25 miles west of Devonshire, Delaware, and then flows southwest to join Rocky Run about 0.5 miles north of Tavistock, Delaware.

See also
List of Delaware rivers

References

Rivers of Delaware
Rivers of New Castle County, Delaware
Tributaries of the Christina River